Charles McDonald may refer to:

 Charles James McDonald (1793–1860), politician and jurist from the U.S. state of Georgia
 Charles McDonald (Australian politician) (1860–1925), Speaker of the Australian House of Representatives
 Charles McDonald (Canadian politician) (1867–1936), Saskatchewan MLA and later MP and Senator in the Canadian House of Commons
 Charles McDonald (footballer) (1901–1978), Australian rules footballer for South Melbourne
 Charles McDonald (Irish politician) (born 1935), Irish Fine Gael Senator, TD and MEP
 Charles McDonald (Louisiana politician) (born 1938), member of the Louisiana House of Representatives, 1991–2008
 Charles C. McDonald (1933–2017), general in the United States Air Force
 Charles George McDonald (1892–1970), Australian academic
 Charles Daniel McDonald (born 1976), Scottish fashion journalist and digital media entrepreneur
 Charlie McDonald (bobsleigh) (1932–1984), American Olympic bobsledder

See also
 Charles MacDonald (disambiguation)